Pairot Eiammak (born February 25, 1992), or simply known as Art, is a Thai professional footballer who plays as a goalkeeper for Thai League 1 club Chiangmai United.

Honours

Club
Nakhon Ratchasima
 Thai Division 1 League (1): 2014

External links

1992 births
Living people
Pairot Eiammak
Pairot Eiammak
Association football goalkeepers
Pairot Eiammak
Pairot Eiammak
Pairot Eiammak
Pairot Eiammak
Pairot Eiammak
Pairot Eiammak